Rhodanobacter humi is a Gram-negative, alkalitolerant, acidtolerant, aerobic, rod-shaped, non-spore-forming and non-motile bacterium from the genus of Rhodanobacter which has been isolated from forest soil.

References

External links
Type strain of Rhodanobacter humi at BacDive -  the Bacterial Diversity Metadatabase

Xanthomonadales
Bacteria described in 2017